Evan Lloyd Jones ( 20 November 1931 – 3 August 2022) was an Australian poet and academic.

Early life
Born in Melbourne, 20 November 1931, Jones attended Melbourne High School, and studied at the University of Melbourne, and Stanford University (1958–1960) .

Career
After 1960, he taught English at the University of Melbourne.

Works
Inside the Whale: poems, Melbourne: Cheshire, 1960
Understandings: poems, Cambridge University Press, 1967
Kenneth MacKenzie, by Evan Jones, 'Australian writers and their work' series, Oxford University Press, 1969
The Poems of Kenneth Mackenzie, edited by Evan Jones and Geoffrey Little, Angus and Robertson, Sydney, 1972
Recognitions, Australian National University Press, 1978
Left at the Post, University of Queensland Press, 1984
The politic body and other poems, Picaro Press, 2009
Alone At Last!, Picaro Press, 2009
Heavens Above, Picaro Press, 2011
Selected Poems, Grand Parade Poets, 2014

References

External links
Improlific poet, review by Geoff Page, Australian Book Review, January–February 2015, no. 368
Selected Poems review: The inquiring works of Evan Jones, review by Gig Ryan, The Age, 15 January 2015
Evan Jones: Selected Poems, review by Martin Duwell, Australian Poetry Review, 1 February 2015
Review Short: Evan Jones’s Selected Poems, review by Alyson Miller, Cordite, 5 May 2015
Obituary, by Alex Skovron, Sydney Morning Herald, 24 October 2022 
https://www.smh.com.au/national/nsw/literary-giant-wrote-with-relaxing-ease-20220923-p5bkhi.html

1931 births
2022 deaths
Australian literary critics
Australian poets
University of Melbourne alumni
Poets from Melbourne